Theodore Roosevelt IV (June 14, 1914 – May 2, 2001), also known as Theodore III, was an American banker, government official, and veteran of World War II. He was a grandson of President Theodore Roosevelt through his father, Brig. Gen. Theodore Roosevelt III. His name suffix varies since President Roosevelt's father was Theodore Roosevelt Sr., though the same-named son did not commonly use a "Jr." name suffix.

Early life

Roosevelt was born on June 14, 1914 in New York City. He was the second born and the last surviving of four children to Theodore Jr. and Eleanor Butler Alexander. Theodore had an older sister, Grace Green Roosevelt, who married William McMillan, and two younger brothers, Cornelius Van Schaack Roosevelt III and Quentin Roosevelt II. Following his father, Ted, and paternal grandfather, T. R., Theodore went to Groton School and graduated from Harvard in 1936, where he was a member of the Hasty Pudding Theatricals and the Owl Club. While at Harvard, Roosevelt played for the Harvard Crimson men's soccer team, and was named a second-team All American in 1934.

When his grandfather, President Theodore "T. R." Roosevelt Jr., died in 1919, his father took on the "Junior" last name suffix. As a result, he was known as Theodore III, rather than Theodore IV.  As an Oyster Bay Roosevelt, Ted was a descendant of the Schuyler family.  His maternal grandparents are Henry Addison Alexander and Grace Green.

Career
After graduating from Harvard, Roosevelt worked for the DuPont company from 1936 to 1941.

Service in World War II
Following the Roosevelt tradition of military service during times of national emergency, during World War II, Roosevelt volunteered as a Navy pilot, serving as a flag lieutenant (i.e. an aide to an admiral) in the Pacific theater. For his service as a naval aviator, Theodore was awarded the Air Medal.  He was promoted to lieutenant on April 1, 1944 and left the Navy as a lieutenant commander.

Post-war life

Upon his return from the Pacific Theater, Theodore joined the Philadelphia brokerage firm of Montgomery, Scott, becoming a partner in 1952. Appointed by Governor James Duff, Ted served as Secretary of Commerce of Pennsylvania from 1949 to 1951.

For many years, he was president of the Competitive Enterprise System, Inc., a nonprofit organization that promoted free markets in the United States. Roosevelt was a trustee of the Theodore Roosevelt Association (TRA) for many years and a generous supporter of the organization. In recent years, he attended TRA Police Awards ceremonies in Boston and Philadelphia as well as TRA annual meetings in Boston and Norfolk, VA. He was an honorary plank owner in the USS Theodore Roosevelt, and a strong supporter of the efforts to preserve the Pine Knot site in Virginia, his grandparents' presidential retreat.

Personal life
On February 3, 1940, Roosevelt married Anne Mason Babcock (December 3, 1917 — January 29, 2001), daughter of George Wheeler Babcock (May 12, 1879 — November 21, 1950) and Anne Mason Bonnycastle Robinson (January 10, 1886 — February 4, 1923). They had one son, Theodore Roosevelt IV (born 1942).

Roosevelt died on May 2, 2001 in Bryn Mawr, Pennsylvania. He and his wife are buried near Somesville, Maine.

References

External links

1914 births
2001 deaths
Theodore
United States Navy personnel of World War II
American people of Dutch descent
American people of English descent
American people of French descent
American people of Scottish descent
American people of Welsh descent
Recipients of the Air Medal
Businesspeople from New York City
Burials in Maine
Bulloch family
Schuyler family
Harvard Crimson men's soccer players
Soccer players from New York (state)
Hasty Pudding alumni
Association footballers not categorized by position
United States Navy officers
Association football players not categorized by nationality